Çilekeş (lit. 'Sufferer') is a Turkish rock band active since 2002.

Band history

Çilekeş was founded in 2002 in Ankara. The band received greater fame after winning the music contest "Genç Yetenekler Aramızda" (Young Talents Among Us), sponsored by the Fanta drinks company, in 2003, juried by such famous Turkish artists like Teoman and Levent Yüksel. After the contest, still as an amateur band, they were invited to a tour, comprising 17 cities, during which they performed to an approximate total of 350,000 audience.

The band members are Görkem Karabudak (vocals, rhythm guitar), Ali Güçlü Şimşek (lead guitar), Gökhan Şahinkaya (bass guitar), Cumhur Avcil (drums).

The band's first album, entitled Y.O.K. was released by On-air in 2005. They released their second work entitled Katil Dans in 2008. At 2010, they released their third album "Histeri Çalışmaları" which is available for download at their official web page.

Discography
Y.O.K. (Onair Müzik) (2005)
 Kendimden geriye - 3:56
 Y.O.K. - 4:41
 Çilekeş (Ardıma hiç bakmadan) - 3:41
 Gözaltı - 3:51
 Kurar - 4:35
 Yetmiyor - 4:36
 Körpe - 4:33
 Sorma - 4:39
 Siyah - 4:45
 Yeniden - 3:50
 Kendimden geriye II - 18:26

Katil Dans (P.i. Müzik) (2008)
 Akrep - 5:50 	   	
 Diril - 5:08		
 Katil Dans - 6:44 	
 Her Deniz - 4:05
 Kulağakaçan (Instrumental) - 1:44
 Hıt Dalasi - 3:02 	
 Sinir - 5:11
 Bir Ses Yap - 4:22
Pervazda Tatil  (feat. Şebnem Ferah) - 7:09

Histeri Çalışmaları (Lin Records) (2010)
 Tanı - 0:51
 Takla - 5:50
 Hezarfen - 3:21
 Havale - 4:42
 Kafakafesi - 5:20
 Kara Mizah - 4:17
 Röntgen - 2:04
 Askı - 6:24
 Sine - 2:10
 Taç - 4:51
 Neva - 8:25
 Sır - 3:20

References

External links
 Official website

Turkish alternative rock groups
Turkish progressive rock groups
Musical groups from Ankara
Musical groups established in 2002
Musical quartets
2002 establishments in Turkey